Artyom Vitalyevich Mamin (born 25 July 1997) is a Russian football player. He plays for FC Ural Yekaterinburg.

Club career
He made his debut in the Russian Football National League for FC Spartak-2 Moscow on 1 April 2017 in a game against FC Zenit-2 St. Petersburg.

He made his Russian Premier League debut for FC Spartak Moscow on 5 May 2018 in a game against FC Rostov.

On 7 August 2019, he returned to his native city, signing a long-term contract with FC Ural Yekaterinburg. He made his debut for the main squad of FC Ural Yekaterinburg on 25 September 2019 in a Russian Cup game against FC Chernomorets Novorossiysk.

On 22 June 2021, he joined FC Chayka Peschanokopskoye on a season-long loan. Before the season started, Chayka was punished for match fixing and relegated, and on 8 July 2021, he moved on loan to FC Tom Tomsk instead. On 3 September 2021, he was recalled from loan and returned to Ural.

Personal life
His younger brother Aleksei Mamin is also a football player.

Career statistics

References

External links
 
 
 Profile by Russian Football National League

1997 births
Sportspeople from Yekaterinburg
Living people
Russian footballers
Russia youth international footballers
Association football defenders
FC Spartak-2 Moscow players
FC Spartak Moscow players
FC Ural Yekaterinburg players
FC Orenburg players
FC Chayka Peschanokopskoye players
FC Tom Tomsk players
Russian Premier League players
Russian First League players
Russian Second League players